Tiruchengode is a neighbourhood in Namakkal district, Tamil Nadu, India.

Tiruchengode may also refer to:
 Tiruchengode town
 Tiruchengode block
 Tiruchengode taluk
 Tiruchengode division
 Tiruchengode (state assembly constituency) 
 Tiruchengode (Lok Sabha constituency)